The 1920 college football season had no clear-cut champion, with the Official NCAA Division I Football Records Book listing California, Georgia, Harvard, Notre Dame, and Princeton as national champions. Only California and Princeton claim national championships for the 1920 season. Andy Smith's Pacific Coast Conference champion California "Wonder Team" was the first national champion from the Pacific Coast. Princeton and Harvard were undefeated and with one tie to each other. Notre Dame was led by its first Walter Camp All-American, George Gipp, who died before the year was over.

In the south, fans of either side in Georgia were happy. Georgia and Georgia Tech were both undefeated in Southern play. Georgia Tech lost to Pitt, which was undefeated with two ties. No team scored through Georgia's line, and its backfield was known as the "ten second backfield". Jimmy Leech of VMI's "Flying Squadron" led the nation in scoring. One writer claimed "he is one of the greatest broken field runners the country has ever seen."

The Southwest Conference saw an undefeated Texas team with the same 9-0 record as the champions cited above.  Texas shut out six of the nine teams they faced and scored 282 points while allowing only 13. The final game of the year for Texas against Texas A&M was cited as the real beginning of the storied rivalry between the two schools, which dates back to 1894 and featured 118 contests, in which Texas won 75 and tied 5.

In the Rose Bowl, Cal defeated Ohio State 28–0. Brick Muller completed a 53-yard touchdown pass to Brodie Stephens after receiving a toss from Pesky Sprott, at the time thought impossible.

Conference and program changes

Conference establishments
Two new conferences began play in 1920:
Minnesota Intercollegiate Athletic Conference – an active NCAA Division III conference
Tri-Normal League – active until 1984; later known as the Washington Intercollegiate Conference and Evergreen Conference''

Membership changes

Bowl games
California defeated Ohio State, 28–0, in the 1921 Rose Bowl. The first and only Fort Worth Classic was held on January 1, 1921, with Centre defeating TCU.

Conference standings

Major conference standings

Independents

Minor conferences

Minor conference standings

Awards and honors

All-Americans

The consensus All-America team included:

Statistical leaders
Player scoring most points: Jimmy Leech, VMI, 210
Player scoring most touchdowns, Jimmy Leech, 26
Total offense leader: Jimmy Leech, 1771
Rushing yards leader: Jimmy Leech, 1723
Rushing avg leader: Buck Flowers, Georgia Tech, 10.2
Receptions leader: Eddie Anderson, Notre Dame, 17
Receiving yards leader: Eddie Anderson, 293

References